T. K. Balachandran was an Indian actor who worked mainly in Malayalam films. He has acted in more than 200 films. His areas of contribution includes Production, Dialogue, Story, Screenplay. He is the first actor to do a double role in the history of Malayalam cinema.

Background
T. K. Balachandran was born as the fifth son of Kunjan Pillai and Parukkuttiyamma. At 13 years of age, he acted in the movie "Prahlaada" in 1940. In 1968, he acted in Viruthan Shanku, the first full-length comedy in Malayalam cinema directed by P. Venu. In 1998, the Malayalam, Tamil, Kannada and Telugu Cinema Industry jointly elected him President of the South Indian Film Chamber. Taking into consideration his invaluable contributions to Indian Cinema, he was awarded the President's gold medal. He has also received numerous awards and recognition. He died at home in Thiruvananthapuram, at 78 years of age, on 15 December 2005 after fighting a prolonged battle with cancer. He is survived by his wife and son.

Family
He was married to Vishalakshi. The couple had two sons Vasanth and Vinod. Actor Vanchiyoor Madhavan Nair was his elder brother.

Filmography

As an actor

Malayalam

 Ellaavarkkum Nanmakal (1987)
Snehicha Kuttathinu (1985) as Advocate 
 Inakkily (1984)
 Aagamanam (1980)
 Pambaram (1979) as Swami
 Sakhaakkale Munnottu (1977)
 Chirikkudukka (1976)
 Yakshagaanam (1976)
 Prasadam (1976) as Chellappan
 Devi Kanyaakumaari (1974)
 Raakkuyil (1973)
 Udayam (1973)
 Aaradi Manninte Janmi (1972) as Murali
 Azhimukham (1972)
 Professor (1972) as Das
 Vidyarthikale Ithile Ithile (1972)
 Sree Guruvayoorappan (1972)
 Anubhavangal Paalichakal (1971) as Kumaran
 Aana Valarthiya Vaanampaadiyude Makan (1971)
 Vimochanasamaram (1971)
 Vivaaham Swargathil (1970)
 Priya (1970)
 Ezhuthaatha Kadha (1970)
 Padicha Kallan (1969)
 Ballaatha Pahayan (1969) as Chandran
 Vilakkappetta Bandhangal (1969)
 Kumara Sambhavam (1969) as Naradan
 Adhyaapika (1968)
 Viplavakarikal (1968) as Ravi
 Viruthan Shanku (1968) as Kittunni
 Karutha Rathrikal (1967)
 Agniputhri (1967) as Balendran
 Jeevikkaan Anuvadikkoo (1967)
 Kanakachilanka (1966)
 Karuna (1966)
 Kalithozhan (1966)
 Chettathi (1965) as Gopi
 Bhoomiyile Malakha (1965) as Mathews
 Omanakuttan(1964)
 Bharthavu (1964)
 Kalanju Kittiya Thankam (1964) as Madhu
 Snehadeepam (1962) as Chandran
 Sreeraama Pattaabhishekam (1962)
 Christmas Rathri(1961) as Dr Mathew
 Bhaktha Kuchela (1961) as Naradan
 Poothali (1960)
 Aniyathi (1955) as Babu
 Prahlada (1941)

Tamil
 Jathagam (1953)
 Andha Naal (1954)
 Nadodi Mannan (1958)
 Pandi Thevan (1958)
 Deivathin Deivam (1962)
 Kulavilakku (1969)
 Neethi (1972)

Production
 Aalasyam (1990)
 Ellaavarkkum Nanmakal (Puthan Thalamura) (1987)
 TP Baalagopaalan MA (1986)
 Snehicha Kuttathinu (1985)
 Oru Thettinte Kadha (1984)
 Deepaaradhana (1983)
 Drohi (1982)
 Rakthasaakshi (1982)
 Kaattukallan (1981)
 Pralayam (1980)
 Kaalam Kaathuninnilla (1979)
 Pambaram (1979)
 Praarthana (1978)
 Sakhaakkale Munnottu (1977)
 Prasaadam (1976)
 Chief Guest (1975)
 Poymukhangal (1973)

Story
 Deepaaradhana (1983)
 Drohi (1982)
 Rakthasaakshi (1982)
 Kaattukallan (1981)
 Praarthana (1978)
 Chief Guest (1975)

Dialogue, screenplay
 Deepaaradhana (1983)
 Rakthasaakshi (1982)
 Pambaram (1979)

References

 Blogger
 TK Balachandran
 Check out lists of Movies by #TKBalachandran #Filmography

External links

 T. K. Balachandran at MSI

Indian male film actors
Male actors from Kerala
Male actors in Malayalam cinema
1928 births
2005 deaths
Malayalam film producers
Film producers from Kerala
Malayalam screenwriters
20th-century Indian dramatists and playwrights
Male actors in Tamil cinema
20th-century Indian male actors
Screenwriters from Kerala
Deaths from cancer in India
20th-century Indian screenwriters